Stuur Groete aan Mannetjies Roux (English: "Send greetings to Mannetjies Roux") is a 2013 film in Afrikaans about a teenage girl who visits her aunt and uncle on their Karoo farm during the school vacation. She makes a series of discoveries: she finds out who she really is and where she comes from. Three visitors in one week change her life forever, and her uncle's obsession with the try by Mannetjies Roux is finally explained.

The film has nothing to do with the life of South African rugby player Mannetjies Roux, but rather with the try which he scored in 1962 in Bloemfontein against the British Lions.

The film is based on the title and lyrics of one of Laurika Rauch's most famous songs "Stuur Groete aan Mannetjies Roux". The song describes life on the uncle's farm from the girl's point-of-view, most notably the uncle's Diesel-powered car, the longing for rain and the try scored by Mannetjies Roux.

Main actors 
 Ian Roberts as Oom Frans
 Anna-Mart van der Merwe as Tante Koba
 Lizelle de Klerk as Engela
 Elton Landrew as Toemaar
 Steffie le Roux as Anna
 Wilhelm van der Walt as Anton
 Ilse Oppelt as Katie
 Laurika Rauch as Engela (as an adult)

See also 

 List of Afrikaans-language films

References

External links 
 
 

Films based on songs
Afrikaans-language films